The Corona di Redorta is a mountain of the Swiss Lepontine Alps, located between Lavizzara and Sonogno in the canton of Ticino. Culminating at a height of 2,804 metres above sea level, the Corona di Redorta is the second highest summit of the Valle Verzasca, after Pizzo Barone.

References

External links
 Corona di Redorta on Hikr

Mountains of the Alps
Mountains of Switzerland
Mountains of Ticino
Lepontine Alps